ZMailer is a SMTP mail transfer agent for Linux, BSD and other Unix-like systems.

It is intended for gateways or mail servers or other large site environments that have extreme demands on the abilities of the mailer.

It was first developed in 1988, in reaction to the then existing problems with Sendmail, by Rayan S. Zachariassen at the University of Toronto. The lead developer, since at least 1994, is Matti E. Aarnio.

While official releases have recently been infrequent, regular development and bug-fixes occur in CVS.

ZMailer supports all the modern features expected in a MTA including DNSBL, SPF, and message content scanning.

One site of note utilizing ZMailer is vger.kernel.org, hosting the various Linux kernel mailing lists.

References

External links

 Zmscanner input filter for synchronous SMTP input message scanning with many mechanisms, including ClamAV antivirus.
 Zmscanner additional modules
 Dovecot LDA as local delivery agent for ZMailer

Message transfer agents